Hypancistrus furunculus is a species of armored catfish endemic to Venezuela where it occurs in the Orinoco River.

References
 

Ancistrini
Fish of Venezuela
Endemic fauna of Venezuela
Taxa named by Jonathan W. Armbruster
Taxa named by Nathan Keller Lujan
Taxa named by Donald Charles Taphorn Baechle 
Fish described in 2007